Melittia oedipus, the African vine borer, is a moth of the family Sesiidae. It originates from Africa (where it is known from Equatorial Guinea, Malawi, South Africa, Tanzania, Zambia, Zimbabwe and Kenya), but has been introduced in Hawaii to control ivy gourd (Coccinia grandis).

The wingspan is 10–15 mm.

The larvae feed on Coccinia grandis.

References

External links
Species info

Sesiidae
Moths of Africa
Moths described in 1878